Otaviano Olavo Pivetta (born 10 May 1959) is a Brazilian farmer, businessman, politician, and former Mayor of Lucas do Rio Verde in Brazil. Pivetta is a member of the Democratic Labour Party (PDT).

References 

|-

|-

1959 births
Living people
Brazilian people of Italian descent
Brazilian farmers
Brazilian businesspeople
Democratic Labour Party (Brazil) politicians